Gold Peak Tea is a brand of ready-to-drink iced tea manufactured by The Coca-Cola Company. It was first introduced in 2006 while a chilled version was launched in 2009. Past formulations of the product had won the ChefsBest award for best taste when it was made with tea leaves from the Kenyan Rift Valley. As of 2019, Gold Peak tea is no longer made from concentrate and is now brewed and bottled in their juice plants.

Products

Sizes

The product, sold in plastic bottles, comes in an 18.5 fl. oz. individual size. The chilled version comes in both a 59-fl. oz. and an 89-fl. oz. multi-serve size. It was originally sold in glass bottles but was changed to plastic. Gold Peak launched a 64-oz sized bottle sold at room temperature in most grocery outlets. Some flavors are also available in 500-ml six-packs.

Flavors
 California Raisin Raspberry Tea
 Diet Tea
 Diet Green Tea
 Extra Sweet Tea
 Georgia Peach Tea
 Green Tea
 Lemon Tea
 Lemonade Tea
 Maine Blueberry Tea
 Slightly Sweet Tea
 Sweet Tea
 Unsweetened Tea
 Unsweetened Lemon Tea
 Unsweetened Raspberry Tea

References

External links
 

Coca-Cola brands
Iced tea brands
Products introduced in 2006